Robert Halliday may refer to:

 Robert Halliday (bishop) (b. 1932), Bishop Emeritus of Brechin
 Robert Halliday (footballer) (b. 1986), Scottish football defender
 Robert Halliday (businessman) (–1840), Scottish-American businessman

See also
 Robert Halliday Gunning (1818–1900), Scottish surgeon, entrepreneur and philanthropist. 
 Robert Holliday (1933–2014), American politician.
 Robert Cortes Holliday (1880–1947), American writer and literary editor